John Michael Barone (born June 28, 1946) is an American organist, radio host, and producer, specializing in the pipe organ. His weekly Pipedreams program is distributed by American Public Media. He was the classical music director at Minnesota Public Radio for 25 years and had served as host for broadcasts of the Saint Paul Chamber Orchestra and MPR's The New Releases.

Biography

Barone's interest in organ music began in his teens, at first listening to recordings then playing at his hometown church in Kingston, Pennsylvania. He attended Oberlin College, worked at the student-run WOBC-FM radio station, and graduated from Oberlin Conservatory in 1968 with a degree in music history. He began his professional radio career as the music director of KSJR-FM located at St. John's University in Collegeville, Minnesota. The station evolved into Minnesota Public Radio, where he served as classical music director for 25 years.

Beginning in 1970, he was host for and produced a weekly Sunday night broadcast of organ music, known as The Organ Program. In 1982, he created a 14-episode series of live performance recordings, derived in large part from concerts during the 1980 National Convention of the American Guild of Organists. This successful "pilot" program evolved into the weekly Pipedreams show, beginning in October 1983.

He was an adviser and consultant to pipe organ installations at the Walt Disney Concert Hall in Los Angeles and has served as a program consultant to the organ series at the Kimmel Center in Philadelphia. He has commissioned a cycle of preludes and fugues for organ from composer Henry Martin, which began to be published in 2008.

Accolades

In 1996 Barone was awarded the biennial President's Award for "outstanding contributions to the art of the organ" from the American Guild of Organists. In 1997 he received the Distinguished Service Award from the Organ Historical Society, which he would later serve as president.

In 2001 his Pipedreams series was awarded American Society of Composers, Authors and Publishers's Deems Taylor Radio Broadcast Award for Excellence. He received a 2002 citation for his longevity and service to classical music in public radio. Also in 2002 he was inducted into the Minnesota Music Hall of Fame.

The American Guild of Organists commissioned Haig Mardirosian to create a monograph on Barone published in 2017, the first in an AGO series.

On August 20, 2018, Barone was feted by colleagues on the 50th anniversary of his continuous employment at Minnesota Public Radio.  That anniversary and the 35th anniversary of the continuous weekly presence of Pipedreams in national distribution was celebrated, in conjunction with the Twin Cities chapter of the American Guild of Organists, with a special concert and reception at the Wooddale Church in Eden Prairie, involving eight local organists, one guest player, and the largest mechanical-action pipe organ in the upper midwest.

References

External links
 Pipedreams: About the host

1946 births
Living people
Classical music radio presenters
NPR personalities
American Public Media
Minnesota Public Radio people
Oberlin College alumni
People from Kingston, Pennsylvania